The National Olympic Committee – Kenya (IOC code: KEN) is the National Olympic Committee representing Kenya. It was created in 1955 and recognised by the IOC that same year.

Kenya made its debut at the 1956 Summer Olympics in Melbourne, Australia.

The current President of the National Olympic Committee - Kenya is distance running legend Paul Tergat since 2017, taking over from another distance running legend Kipchoge Keino who had been in charge since 1999.

President
1999 to 2017 – Kipchoge Keino
2017 to present – Paul Tergat

See also
Kenya at the Olympics
Kenya at the Commonwealth Games

References

Kenya
Kenya
 
Sports governing bodies in Kenya